Johannes Ager (born 10 March 1984) is an Austrian former professional tennis player.

Ager is a Tyrol native, born in the village of Brixlegg. He was a member of the Austrian junior Davis Cup team that competed at the World Youth Cup in 2000 and finished second to Australia.

On the professional tour, Ager won 12 ITF Futures singles titles and had a career best ranking of 266 in the world, which he reached in 2004. He featured in ATP Tour main draws at the 2002 International Raiffeisen Grand Prix in Sankt Pölten and the 2004 Generali Open in Kitzbühel.

References

External links
 
 

1984 births
Living people
Austrian male tennis players
Sportspeople from Tyrol (state)
People from Kufstein District